Mita or MITA can refer to:

Mita (name)
Mit'a or mita, a form of public service in the Inca Empire and later in the Viceroyalty of Peru
Mita, Meguro, Tokyo, a neighborhood in Tokyo, Japan
Mita, Minato, Tokyo, a neighborhood in Tokyo, Japan
Mita Dōri, a road in Tokyo, Japan
Mita Elementary School, a school in Tokyo, Japan
Mita Congregation, a Puerto Rican church organisation
Mita Hills Dam, a dam in Zambia
Mita Industrial Co., a former producer of photocopiers
Mita Station, a subway complex in Tokyo, Japan
Melbourne Immigration Transit Accommodation, a detention centre in Victoria, Australia
Mita, king of the Mushki in Asia Minor, 8th century BCE
MITA, another name for the protein that acts as stimulator of interferon genes

See also